Kalle Lehtinen (born 12 October 1968) is a retired Finnish football midfielder.

He is the father of Alex Lehtinen.

References

1964 births
Living people
Finnish footballers
FC Kontu players
FC Kuusysi players
FC Locarno players
FinnPa players
Helsingin Jalkapalloklubi players
PK-35 Vantaa (men) players
Association football midfielders
Finnish expatriate footballers
Expatriate footballers in Switzerland
Finnish expatriate sportspeople in Switzerland
Swiss Super League players
Finland under-21 international footballers
Footballers from Helsinki